Crowell High School is a public high school located in Crowell, Texas USA and classified as a 1A school by the UIL.  It is part of the Crowell Independent School District located in central Foard County .  In 2015, the school was rated "Met Standard" by the Texas Education Agency.

Athletics
The Crowell Wildcats compete in these sports - 

Cross Country, 6-Man Football, Basketball, Golf, Tennis & Track

State Titles
Football - 
2013(6M/D1), 2014(6M/D1)
Boys Track - 
1971(1A)
One Act Play - 
1933(All)

References

External links
Crowell ISD
List of Six-man football stadiums in Texas

Schools in Foard County, Texas
Public high schools in Texas
Public middle schools in Texas